Hexalectris revoluta, the Chisos Mountain crested coralroot, is a terrestrial, myco-heterotrophic orchid lacking chlorophyll and subsisting entirely on nutrients obtained from mycorrhizal fungi in the soil. It is closely related to H. colemanii; the two are regarded by some authors as varieties of the same species. Hexalectris revoluta is native to western Texas, southeastern New Mexico and Chihuahua.

References

Bletiinae
Myco-heterotrophic orchids
Orchids of the United States
Orchids of Mexico
Flora of Texas
Flora of New Mexico
Flora of Chihuahua (state)
Plants described in 1941